Ion suppression in LC-MS and LC-MS/MS refers to reduced detector response, or signal:noise as a manifested effect of competition for ionisation efficiency in the ionisation source, between the analyte(s) of interest and other endogenous or exogenous (e.g. plasticisers extracted from plastic tubes, mobile phase additives) species which have not been removed from the sample matrix during sample preparation. Ion suppression is not strictly a problem unless interfering compounds elute at the same time as the analyte of interest. In cases where ion suppressing species do co-elute with an analyte, the effects on the important analytical parameters including precision, accuracy and limit of detection (analytical sensitivity) can be extensive, severely limiting the validity of an assay's results.

History
At its inception as a tool of analytical chemistry, LC-MS/MS spread rapidly and indeed continues to do so in (amongst others) bioanalytical fields, owing to its selectivity for analytes of interest. Indeed, in many cases this selectivity can lead to a misconception that it is always possible to simplify or (on occasion) almost completely remove the necessity for extensive sample preparation. Consequently, LC-MS/MS has become the analytical tool of choice for bioanalysis owing to its impressive sensitivity and selectivity over other, more conventional chromatographic approaches. However, during and after uptake by bioanalytical laboratories worldwide, it became apparent that there were inherent problems with detection of relatively small analyte concentrations in the complex sample matrices associated with biological fluids (e.g. blood and  urine).

Proposed mechanisms of ion suppression
Put simply, ion suppression describes the adverse effect on detector response due to reduced ionisation efficiency for analyte(s) of interest, resulting from the presence of species in the sample matrix which compete for ionisation, or inhibit efficient ionisation in other ways. Use of MS/MS as a means of detection may give the impression that there are no interfering species present, since no chromatographic impurities are detected. However, species which are not isobaric may still have an adverse effect on the sensitivity, accuracy and precision of the assay owing to suppression of the ionisation of the analyte of interest.

Although the precise chemical and physical factors involved in ion suppression are not fully understood, it has been proposed that basicity, high concentration, mass and more intuitively, co-elution with the analyte of interest are factors which should not be ignored.

The most common atmospheric pressure ionisation techniques used in LC-MS/MS are electrospray ionization (ESI) and atmospheric pressure chemical ionization (APCI). APCI is less prone to pronounced ion suppression than ESI, an inherent property of the respective ionisation mechanisms.

In APCI, the sole source of ion suppression can be attributed to the change of colligative properties in the solute during evaporization (King et al, J. Am. Soc. Mass Spectrom 2000, 11, 942-950).

ESI has a more complex ionisation mechanism, relying heavily on droplet charge excess and as such there are many more factors to consider when exploring the cause of ion suppression. It has been widely observed that for many analytes, at high concentrations, ESI exhibits a loss of detector response linearity, perhaps due to reduced charge excess caused by analyte saturation at the droplet surface, inhibiting subsequent ejection of gas phase ions from further inside the droplet. Thus competition for space and/or charge may be considered as a source of ion suppression in ESI. Both physical and chemical properties of analytes (e.g. basicity and surface activity) determine their inherent ionisation efficiency. Biological sample matrices naturally tend to contain many endogenous species with high basicity and surface activity, hence the total concentration of these species in the sample will quickly reach levels at which ion suppression should be expected.

Another explanation of ion suppression in ESI considers the physical properties of the droplet itself rather than the species present. High concentrations of interfering components give rise to an increased surface tension and viscosity, giving a reduction in desolvation (solvent evaporation), which is known to have a marked effect of ionisation efficiency.

The third proposed theory for ion suppression in ESI relates to the presence of non-volatile species which can either cause co-precipitation of analyte in the droplet (thus preventing ionisation) or prevent the contraction of droplet size to the critical radius required for the ion evaporation and/or charge residue mechanisms to form gas phase ions efficiently.

It is worthwhile to consider that the degree of ion suppression may be dependent on the concentration of the analyte being monitored. A higher analyte/matrix ratio can give a reduced effect of ion suppression.

Assessment of ion suppression during method validation

Since it is accepted that ion suppression has the potential to affect the other analytical parameters of any assay, a prudent approach to any LC-MS method development should include an evaluation of ion-suppression. There are two accepted protocols by which this may be achieved, described as follows.

Monitoring of detector response under constant infusion 

The more comprehensive approach to assessment of ion suppression is to constantly infuse an appropriate concentration into the mobile phase flow, downstream from the analytical column, using a syringe pump and a 'tee union'. A typical sample should then be injected through the HPLC inlet as per the usual analytical parameters.

Monitoring of detector response during this experiment should yield a constant signal appropriate to the concentration of infused species. Once the sample has been injected, a drop in signal intensity (or a negative response) should be observed any time a species is ionised in the ion source. This should allow the retention time of any such species under the analytical parameters of the assay to be determined. Any species causing a negative response may be considered to be contributing to ion suppression, but only if such species co-elute with the analyte of interest.

It is also important to consider that species contributing to ion suppression may be retained by the column to a much greater extent than the analyte of interest. To this end, the detector response should be monitored for several times the usual chromatographic run time to ensure that ion suppression will not affect subsequent injections.

Preparation of spiked plasma samples 
Another approach to evaluation of ion suppression is to make a comparison between:

 Detector response of calibration standard (either aqueous or in another suitable solvent) - This gives the best case scenario for detector response, i.e. under conditions of zero ion suppression
 Pre-prepared sample matrix spiked with an identical concentration of analyte - This demonstrates the effect of ion suppression
 Detector response of sample matrix spiked with an identical concentration of analyte and subjected to the usual sample preparation procedure - This can demonstrate the difference between any signal loss due to under-recovery during the sample preparation process and true ion suppression

Approaches to negating ion suppression

There are several strategies for removal and/or negation of ion suppression. These approaches may require in-depth  understanding of the ionisation mechanisms involved in different ionisation sources or may be completely independent of the physical factors involved.

Chromatographic separation 

If the chromatographic separation can be modified to prevent coelution of suppressing species then other approaches need not be considered. The effect of chromatographic modification may be evaluated using the detector response monitoring under constant infusion approach described previously.

Sample preparation 
An effective sample preparation protocol, usually involving either liquid-liquid extraction (LLE) or solid phase extraction (SPE) and frequently derivatisation can remove ion suppressing species from the sample matrix prior to analysis. These common approaches may also remove other interferences, such as isobaric species.

Protein precipitation is another method that can be employed for small molecule analysis. Removal of all protein species from the sample matrix may be effective in some cases, although for many analytes, ion suppressing species are not of protein origin and so this technique is often used in conjunction with extraction and derivatisation.

Sample concentration and mobile phase flow rate 
Dilution of sample or reducing the volume of sample injected may give a reduction of ion suppression by reducing the quantity of interfering species present, although the quantity of analyte of interest will also be reduced, making this an undesirable approach for trace analysis.

Similar is the effect of reducing the mobile phase flow rate to the nanolitre-per-minute range since, in addition to resulting in improved desolvation, the smaller droplets formed are more tolerant to the presence of non-volatile species in the sample matrix.

Calibration techniques to compensate for ion suppression 

It is not always possible to eliminate ion suppression by sample preparation and/or chromatographic resolution. In such cases it may be possible to compensate for the effects of ion suppression on accuracy and precision (although not for analytical sensitivity) by adopting complex calibration strategies.

Matrix matched calibration standards 
Using matrix matched calibration standards can compensate for ion suppression. Using this technique, calibration standards are prepared in identical sample matrix to that used for analysis (e.g. plasma) by spiking a normal sample with known concentrations of analyte. This is not always possible for biological samples, since the analyte of interest is often endogenously present in a clinically significant, albeit normal, quantity. For matrix matched calibration standards to be effective in compensating for ion suppression, the sample matrix must be free of the analyte of interest. Additionally, it is important that there is little variation in test sample composition since both the test sample and the prepared calibration sample must be affected in the same way by ion suppression. Again, in complex biological samples from different individuals, or even the same individual at a different time, there may be large fluctuations in the concentrations of ion suppressing species.

Standard addition 
The standard addition approach involves spiking the same sample extract with several known concentrations of analyte. This technique is more robust and effective than using matrix matched standards but is labor-intensive since each sample must be prepared several times to achieve a reliable calibration.

Internal standard 
In this approach, the sample is spiked with a species (internal standard) which is used to normalise the response of analyte, compensating for variables at any stage of the sample preparation and analysis, including ion suppression.

It is important that the internal standard displays very similar (ideally identical) properties, with respect to detector response (i.e. ionisation), as the analyte of interest. To simplify the selection of internal standard, most laboratories use an analogous stable isotope in an isotope dilution type analysis. The stable isotope is almost guaranteed to be chemically and physically as close as possible to the analyte of interest, hence producing an almost identical detector response in addition to behaving identically during sample preparation and chromatographic resolution. To this end, the ion suppression experienced by both the analyte and the internal standard should be identical. It is important to note that an excessively high concentration of stable isotope internal standard may cause ion suppression itself, since it will co-elute with the analyte of interest. Hence, the internal standard should be added at an appropriate concentration.

Choice of ionization source 
APCI generally suffers less ion suppression than ESI, as discussed previously. Where possible, if ion suppression is unavoidable it may be advisable to switch from ESI to APCI. If this is not possible, it may be useful to switch the ESI ionisation mode from positive to negative. Since fewer compounds are ionisable in negative ionisation mode, it is entirely possible that the ion suppressing species may be removed from the analysis. However, it should also be considered that the analyte of interest may not be ionised effectively in negative mode either, rendering this approach useless.

References

Chromatography
Mass spectrometry